Iran Historical Sovereignty over the tunbs and Tunnbs and BuMusa Islands  (Boumusa is the Iranian name of the island) is a book written by Ali Haghshenas, the Iranian historian. It was published in fall 2010 in Persian.

Chapters
This book includes five chapters as follows:

First Chapter: Addressing theoretical and scientific discussions: analyzing foreign policy, culture of foreign policy, decision-making system structure, factors affecting the foreign policy.

Second Chapter: Historical background of Iranian sovereignty on the Persian Gulf, Iranian sovereignty in the Persian Gulf within 17th and 18th centuries, Iranian sovereignty after Nader Shah Afshar.

Third Chapter: United Arab Emirates and border tensions with the neighbors: roots of the Ghassemis, political and social structure of the United Arab Emirates, border conflicts with the GCC members, border conflicts between United Arab Emirates and Saudi Arabia, border conflicts between United Arab Emirates and Oman, border conflicts between United Arab Emirates and Qatar.

Fourth Chapter: Boumusa, Big Tonb and Small Tonb Islands: political geographical of Boumusa, Greater and Lesser Tunbs Islands, geo-strategic role of the three Iranian islands in the Persian Gulf, historical background of the three Iranian islands, 68 years of occupations of Boumusa, Big Tonb and Small Tonb Islands by Britain (1903- 1971), claims of the United Arab Emirates on Iranian islands and reactions of Iran, conclusion.

Fifth Chapter: Documents, references, English abstract.

References 

2010 non-fiction books
Books about politics of Iran
History books about Iran
Iran–United Arab Emirates relations